Andreas Karkavitsas or Carcavitsas (Greek: Ανδρέας Καρκαβίτσας; Lechaina, 1866 – Marousi, October 10, 1922) was a Greek novelist. He was a naturalist, like Alexandros Papadiamantis.

Biography
He was born in 1866 in the north-west Peloponnese, in the town of Lechaina in Elis. He studied medicine. As an army doctor, he travelled across a great range of  villages and settlements, from which  he recorded traditions and legends. He died on October 10, 1922, of laryngeal cancer. Several streets in Greece have been named after him, for instance in Pyrgos.

Selected writings

Karkavitsas wrote in the European tradition of naturalism (exemplified by Émile Zola), which does not shrink from portraying the seamier parts of life among humble people, rather than romanticising or embellishing reality.  He was a folklorist with a gift for spinning tales full of authentic details of simple people's lives, local customs, dialects and folktales, as well as psychological insights about them.  He was more successful as a short-story and novella writer.  "The Beggar" is a novella about con-men, violence and the grotesque practices of professional beggars (including purposely maiming children to turn them into profitable objects of pity).  "Words from the prow" is about the lives of seafarers, fishermen and sponge-divers, full of arcane details of their craft as well as folk-tale-inflected plots of tragedy, shipwreck, hands lost at sea, murder, superstition and the supernatural, as well as the joys of making a living off the sea.

Translation
 The Beggar, tr. W. F. Wyatt (1982)

References
 Encyclopædia Britannica online

External links 
 
 

1866 births
1922 deaths
People from Elis
19th-century Greek novelists
20th-century Greek novelists
Deaths from laryngeal cancer
Deaths from cancer in Greece